Laurens County Courthouse is a historic courthouse located at Laurens, Laurens County, South Carolina.

History
It was constructed in 1837–1838, and is a granite ashlar and brick Greek Revival style building. The original projecting porticoes in the front and rear have four Corinthian order columns and two simple pilasters.  Wings were added in 1858, and in 1911 further additions were made to the wings, the windows remodeled, and the Palladian stairways added. At this time the low elliptical dome was constructed.

It was added to the National Register of Historic Places in 1972.  It is located in the Laurens Historic District.

Gallery

References

External links

 South Carolina Picture Project

Buildings and structures in Laurens County, South Carolina
County courthouses in South Carolina
Courthouses on the National Register of Historic Places in South Carolina
Government buildings completed in 1838
Greek Revival architecture in South Carolina
Historic district contributing properties in South Carolina
National Register of Historic Places in Laurens County, South Carolina